SM UC-28 was a German Type UC II minelaying submarine or U-boat in the German Imperial Navy during World War I. The U-boat was ordered on 29 August 1915 and was launched on 8 July 1916. She was commissioned into the German Imperial Navy on 6 August 1916 as SM UC-28. In 0 patrols UC-28 sank no ships. UC-28 surrendered to France on 12 February 1919 and was broken up.

Design
A German Type UC II submarine, UC-28 had a displacement of  when at the surface and  while submerged. The submarine was powered by two six-cylinder four-stroke diesel engines each producing  (a total of ), two electric motors producing , and two propeller shafts.

UC-28 was fitted with six  mine tubes, eighteen UC 200 mines, three  torpedo tubes (one on the stern and two on the bow), seven torpedoes, and one  Uk L/30 deck gun. Her complement was twenty-six crew members.

References

Notes

Citations

Bibliography

 
 

Ships built in Hamburg
German Type UC II submarines
U-boats commissioned in 1916
World War I minelayers of Germany
World War I submarines of Germany
1916 ships